Zaïna Meresse, born Boinali on June 18, 1935, in Bandrele and died on April 11, 2014, in Mamoudzou, was a Mahorese activist and politician.

She was one of the leaders of Mahorese Chatouilleuses who claimed Mayotte for France.  She then sat on the general council of Mayotte.

Biography 
Zaïna Méresse, was born on June 18, 1935, in Bandrélé on the island of Grande-Terre, in Mayotte.

She got involved in the 1960s so that Mayotte would remain French during the independence of the Comoros.  With them, other women, such as Coco Djoumoi and Boueni M'Titi, decided to carry out commando actions against the authorities, coming from Grande Comore, by resorting to an original means of action to push them back.  They are then called the Chatouilleuses, of which Zaïna Meresse is "one of the historical combatants". Being married to a metropolitan, she spoke French, unlike the other activists, which enabled her to write letters to the authorities, and also to grant numerous interviews to relate her experience within the movement, contributing to  publicize it.

She subsequently committed to the  Departmental council of Mayotte.

Awards and nominations 
 1978 :  Knight of Ordre national du Mérite
 1994 :  OfficerOrdre national du Mérite
 2004 :  Knight of Legion of Honour
 2013 :  Officer Legion of Honour

References 

Mayotte women
1935 births
2014 deaths
Officiers of the Légion d'honneur
Officers of the Ordre national du Mérite